Lake Angelus is a city in Oakland County in the U.S. state of Michigan. It is an affluent suburb of Detroit, with one of the highest per capita incomes of any community in the state.

History
In the early 1900s, a small community formed around the lake, then called Three Mile Lake. During the 1920s, the lake was renamed Lake Angelus by Mrs. Sollace B. Collidge as the original name stood for the distance from the eastern side of the lake shore to the western shore. The community was under pressure from nearby government establishments to be annexed. In 1929, however, a special state act of legislation was passed, granting Lake Angelus incorporation as a village. Lake Angelus became a city of its own in 1984.

Geography

The city completely surrounds the lake of the same name. The city is bordered:
 To the north and east by the city of Auburn Hills
 To the south by the city of Pontiac
 To the west by Waterford Township

Demographics

2010 census
As of the census of 2010, there were 290 people, 130 households, and 100 families living in the city. The racial makeup of the city was 96.2% White, 0.3% African American, 2.8% Asian, and 0.7% from two or more races. Hispanic or Latino residents of any race were 0.3% of the population.

There were 130 households, of which 14.6% had children under the age of 18 living with them, 70.8% were married couples living together, 3.1% had a female householder with no husband present, 3.1% had a male householder with no wife present, and 23.1% were non-families. 22.3% of all households were made up of individuals, and 9.2% had someone living alone who was 65 years of age or older. The average household size was 2.23 and the average family size was 2.58.

The median age in the city was 55.3 years. 12.1% of residents were under the age of 18; 5.8% were between the ages of 18 and 24; 10.7% were from 25 to 44; 43.8% were from 45 to 64; and 27.6% were 65 years of age or older. The gender makeup of the city was 47.2% male and 52.8% female.

2000 census
As of the census of 2000, there were 326 people, 132 households, and 104 families living in the city. The racial makeup of the city was 96.32% White, 0.92% African American and 2.76% Asian. Hispanic or Latino of any race were 1.23% of the population.

There were 132 households, out of which 25.8% had children under the age of 18 living with them, 76.5% were married couples living together, 0.8% had a female householder with no husband present, and 21.2% were non-families. 20.5% of all households were made up of individuals, and 7.6% had someone living alone who was 65 years of age or older.  The average household size was 2.47 and the average family size was 2.83.

In the city, 20.2% of the population was under the age of 18, 4.3% from 18 to 24, 17.5% from 25 to 44, 36.8% from 45 to 64, and 21.2% was 65 years of age or older.  The median age was 49 years. For every 100 females, there were 106.3 males.  For every 100 females age 18 and over, there were 101.6 males.

The median income for a household in the city was $114,524, and the median income for a family was $131,261. Males had a median income of $100,000 versus $48,750 for females. The per capita income for the city was $83,792.  None of the families and 1.2% of the population were living below the poverty line, including none under eighteen and 2.6% of those over 64.

Education
A portion is in the Pontiac School District.

References

Sources

Cities in Oakland County, Michigan
Metro Detroit
Populated places established in 1929
1929 establishments in Michigan